Kabaddi Once Again (2012) is a Punjabi film starring Varinder Singh Ghuman, Sudeepa Singh, Jaswinder Bhalla, Binnu Dhillon and Nachhatar Gill.

Plot

Ranjit Singh (Nachhatar Gill) is selected to play Kabaddi in England. But he dies on tour and his body is returned to family. Ranjit's elder brother starts hating Kabbadi and forbids his son Shingara from playing Kabbadi. Shingara however loves Kabaddi and nurture  his game secretly with the help of his mother and his aunt. A grown up Shingara becomes an excellent player in his college and is selected for playing at professional level. Similar to his uncle Ranjit, Shinagara is selected to play in England. At this time Shingara's father reveal that Ranjit did not die due to heart attack as was known previously. He died due to drug overdose given to him by the game promoter to increase the strength. However he reluctantly allow Shingara to go to England. Coach of the team (Jaswinder Bhalla) plans to take three persons illegally in the grad of player. He drops three player from the team, but takes them back when rest of the team protests. Still he tricks the team and take them along with him to England. In England coach takes money from the promoter to lose some of the matches. Shingara reacts strongly to this. But coach and three fake players manages to do enough to lose a few matches resulting of exit of the team from tournament. When the team has to go back, the three fake players refuses to go back. Shingara opposes as he can be then accused of illegal human trafficking and the fight breaks. Police then arrest Shingara, coach and the promoter. The rest of the team is sent to India. Love scene breaks out in the airport while an old sardar amrit singh pushes a trolley. Shingara comes clean in the case where as coach and the promoter are sent to jail for two years. Upon return to India, the three fake players attacks Shingara and break his leg. Distraught  Shingara becomes alcoholic due to his failures. On seeing this, his father allows him to play Kabaddi and help him train again. He gathers his old team and starts a new club. Once again successful team goes to England and wins the world cup fulfilling Shingara's dream.

Cast
 Varinder Singh Ghuman as Shingara Singh
 Sudeepa Singh as Kiran
 Amar Noorie as Shingara's Aunt
 Jaswinder Bhalla as Suchha Singh Sandhu
 Binnu Dhillon as Kirpal Singh (Klachh)
 Nachhatar Gill as Ranjit Singh
 Rana Ranbir as Lamteengh
 Rana Jang Bahadur as Paul
 Sardar Sohi as Nashhattar Singh
 Stefan Stoev as Sardar Amrit Rocky Singh Kirpal 
 Yaad Grewal as Toofan singh

References

Indian sports films
Punjabi-language Indian films
2010s Punjabi-language films